is a television subgenre in tokusatsu that involves Japanese superheroes or robots either with the ability to grow to immense heights to fight giant monsters or who are originally giant as a part of their lives. The Kyodai Hero is the mainstream superhero genre that is widely popular in Japan. The first and most famous Kyodai hero is Ultraman who made his debut in 1966. Since then, Ultraman has helped spawn the Kyodai hero genre with countless shows, franchises and films such as Go! Godman and Iron King.

1960s
The inception of the Kyodai hero genre initially began with Godzilla in the film Ghidorah, the Three-Headed Monster. Godzilla is portrayed as a personified natural disaster at first but over the course of the film franchise's many monster battles, he is gradually put into the position of protector of the human race, a key trope of the Kyodai Hero genre. Though Godzilla established the minor concept of the Kyodai Hero, the genre technically began with P-Productions' live action adaptation of Osamu Tezuka's Ambassador Magma which predated the popular Ultraman franchise, by six days. Ultraman was created by the Godzilla films' Special Effects Director and Supervisor Eiji Tsuburaya. Ultraman - a sequel series to the previous Tokusatsu kaiju series Ultra Q - quickly became very popular in its initial run, to the point that Tsuburaya Productions produced sequel show Ultraseven, the second Kyodai Hero show ever produced - this series introduced another trope characteristic of the genre, in that the hero mainly fought aliens and their monster subordinates throughout the show. Ultraseven was the final Tokusatsu Kyodai hero show produced by Eiji Tsuburaya before his death in 1970. Since then, the increase in Ultraman'''s popularity was so great that Tsuburaya Productions decided to revive the franchise in 1970 with The Return of Ultraman, thus creating a series of Ultraman shows which continues to the present day, referred to as the Ultra Series.

1970s
The 70s saw the uprising of Tokusatsu and Kyodai hero shows, which coexisted with and helped shape kaiju films of the era. Tsuburaya Productions restarted the Ultraman series with The Return of Ultraman. This reignited high interest in studios to produce their own tokusatsu shows. Many of the tokusatsu shows from the 70s era mainly featured Kyodai heroes such as Spectreman and Super Robot Red Baron. By 1975, Tokusatsu shows were highly popular in Asia. Toho Studios even invented its own Kyodai hero to fight alongside Godzilla, Jet Jaguar in the film Godzilla vs. Megalon, and introduced numerous other Tokusatsu heroes throughout the 1970's, including Godman, Megaloman and Greenman. In Hong Kong, Shaw Brothers Studio produced its own Henshin/Kyodai hero as well with The Super Inframan. Though stylistically more akin to Kamen Rider, Inframan mixed Kyodai Hero elements into its formula, allowing the titular hero to grow to gigantic size.

Style & techniques
The Kyodai Hero genre usually involves a human (either a host to the hero, or simply a human form) who transforms into the eponymous hero, usually an organic cyborg, android, or robot, and changes to an enormous size to battle a giant monster or aliens. The special effect techniques usually use suitmation and scale models.

List of Kyodai Hero characters

 Ultraman and the rest of his kind from the Ultra Series Aegis Prime (from Dawn of the Monsters)
 Ambassador Magma
 Astro Guy (from King of the Monsters)
 Atomic Guy (from King of the Monsters 2)
 Daitetsujin 17
 Alien Emerald Kain (from Jumborg Ace)
 Fireman
 Ganbaron
 Giant Robo (tokusatsu) 
 Godman
 Greenman
 Gridman the Hyper Agent (adapted into the US as Superhuman Samurai Syber Squad)
 Iron King
 Monster Prince
 Izenborg
 Jaguarman (from an aborted TV series)
 Jet Jaguar (from Godzilla vs Megalon)
 Jumborg 9 (from Jumborg Ace'')
 Jumborg Ace
 Line
 Mach Baron
 Majin Hunter Mitsurugi
 Megaloman
 Mikazuki
 Mirrorman
 Mirrorman Reflex
 Red Baron
 Redman
 Silver Kamen
 Spectreman
 Tekkoki Mikazuki
 Thunder Mask
 WoO
 Zone Fighter

Japanese entertainment terms
Tokusatsu
Japanese superheroes

ja:特撮テレビ番組一覧#巨大ヒーロー・怪獣